Cyrnotheba is a genus of air-breathing, land snails, terrestrial pulmonate gastropod mollusks in the family Helicidae.

Species
Species within the genus Cyrnotheba include:
 Cyrnotheba corsica

References

 
Helicidae
Taxonomy articles created by Polbot